Pholoidae is a family of polychaetes belonging to the order Phyllodocida.

Genera:
 Imajimapholoe Pettibone, 1992
 Laubierpholoe Pettibone, 1992
 Metaxypsamma Wolf, 1986
 Pholoe Johnston, 1839
 Taylorpholoe Pettibone, 1992

References

Polychaetes